Verbesina encelioides is a flowering plant in the family Asteraceae. The species is native to many parts of the United States and Mexico.  It is naturalized in other parts of North America, the Middle East, Spain, Argentina, Australia and the Pacific islands.  Common names include golden crownbeard, gold weed, wild sunflower, cowpen daisy, butter daisy, crown-beard, American dogweed and South African daisy.

The species responds strongly to disturbances on suitable sites and retards the development of other local species. Research has identified an allelopathic effect on radishes which may explain its ability to dominate other species in some locations.

It is a larval host for the bordered patch.

References

encelioides
Flora of Mexico
Flora of the United States
Flora naturalised in Australia
Taxa named by Antonio José Cavanilles